Mladen Kapor (born 12 November 1966) is a Yugoslav swimmer. He competed in two events at the 1992 Summer Olympics.

References

External links
 

1966 births
Living people
Yugoslav male swimmers
Olympic swimmers as Independent Olympic Participants
Swimmers at the 1992 Summer Olympics
Place of birth missing (living people)